This page is a list of chapters of the men's collegiate fraternity Alpha Chi Rho.

Undergraduate chapters 
Active chapters are shown in bold. Inactive chapters are shown in italics.

Notes

Alumni chapters

Active graduate chapters 
 Alpha Phi Alumni Association (Purdue University)
 Alpha Phi Gamma Alumni Chapter (Pace University)
 Delta Phi Alumni Club (Rensselaer Polytechnic Institute)
 Delta Sigma Phi Alumni Association (Worcester Polytechnic Institute)
 Omicron Phi Alumni Association (Utica University)
 Phi Iota Chi Alumni Association (Central Michigan University)
 Phi Kappa Alumni/Housing Association (University of Illinois Urbana–Champaign)
 Phi Lambda Building Association (Pennsylvania State University)
 Phi Mu Chi Alumni Chapter (Lock Haven University of Pennsylvania)
 Phi Phi Club (University of Pennsylvania)
 Pi Phi Alumni Association (Robert Morris University)
 Stockton Alumni Club (Stockton University)
 Zeta Phi Alumni/Housing Corporation (Clarkson University)

Alumni regional clubs 
 Albany, New York
 Atlanta, Georgia
 Baltimore, Maryland
 Boston, Massachusetts
 Buffalo, New York
 Central New Jersey
 Chicago, Illinois
 Cincinnati, Ohio
 Connecticut
 Denver, Colorado
 Detroit, Michigan
 Hartford, Connecticut
 Houston, Texas
 Louisville, Kentucky
 Mid-Florida (Tampa–Orlando)
 New York City, New York
 Philadelphia, Pennsylvania
 Pittsburgh, Pennsylvania
 Research Triangle Area (Chapel Hill–Durham–Raleigh), North Carolina
 San Francisco, California
 Southern California (Los Angeles–San Diego)
 Southern Florida (Ft. Lauderdale–Miami)
 Washington, D.C.

References 

chapters
Lists of chapters of United States student societies by society